This is a list of events from British radio in 1961.

Events
David Davis is appointed head of children's sound broadcasting at the BBC.
Chorus singer Irene Thomas enters and wins the Brain of Britain contest, heralding a forty-year period as a mainstay of radio panel game quiz programmes.
 September – Alan Freeman replaces David Jacobs as the main presenter of Pick of the Pops.

Programme debuts
8 October – In Touch on the BBC Home Service (1961–Present)

Programme endings
29 January – Ray's a Laugh (1949–1961)

Continuing radio programmes
1940s
 Music While You Work (1940–1967)
 Sunday Half Hour (1940–2018)
 Desert Island Discs (1942–Present)
 Family Favourites (1945–1980)
 Down Your Way (1946–1992)
 Have A Go (1946–1967)
 Housewives' Choice (1946–1967)
 Letter from America (1946–2004)
 Woman's Hour (1946–Present)
 Twenty Questions (1947–1976)
 Any Questions? (1948–Present)
 Mrs Dale's Diary (1948–1969)
 Billy Cotton Band Show (1949–1968)
 A Book at Bedtime (1949–Present)

1950s
 The Archers (1950–Present)
 Listen with Mother (1950–1982)
 From Our Own Correspondent (1955–Present)
 Pick of the Pops (1955–Present)
 The Clitheroe Kid (1957–1972)
 My Word! (1957–1988)
 Test Match Special (1957–Present)
 The Today Programme (1957–Present)
 The Navy Lark (1959–1977)
 Sing Something Simple (1959–2001)
 Your Hundred Best Tunes (1959–2007)

1960s
 Farming Today (1960–Present)
 Easy Beat (1960–1967)

Births
1 January – Fiona Phillips, radio and television presenter
3 January – Justin Webb, journalist and presenter on Today3 March – Paul Baskerville, disc jockey
10 April – Nicky Campbell, Scottish-born broadcast presenter
14 May – David Quantick, comedy writer, music journalist and radio broadcaster
28 June – Mark Goodier, disc jockey
17 July – Jeremy Hardy, comedian (died 2019)
22 July – Carolyn Quinn, journalist and presenter on PM''
27 June – Lynn Parsons, disc jockey
25 October – Pat Sharp, radio and television presenter
Unknown
Robin Brooks, radio dramatist
Corrie Corfield, newsreader

Deaths
21 April – Wallace Greenslade, announcer (born 1912)
22 October – L. Stanton Jefferies, musician and radio producer (born 1896)

See also 
 1961 in British music
 1961 in British television
 1961 in the United Kingdom
 List of British films of 1961

References

 
Radio
Years in British radio